The 2011–12 Biathlon World Cup – World Cup 4 was held in Oberhof, Germany, from 4 January until 8 January 2012. It was the fourth of nine scheduled events on the World Cup schedule, with both men and women competing in three different disciplines.

Schedule of events

Medal winners

Men

Women

Achievements

 Best performance of all time

 , 30th place in Sprint
 , 61st place in Sprint
 , 63rd place in Sprint
 , 76th place in Sprint
 , 7th place in Sprint
 , 8th place in Sprint
 , 9th place in Sprint
 , 16th place in Sprint
 , 26th place in Sprint
 , 58th place in Sprint
 , 74th place in Sprint

 First World Cup race

 , 80th place in Sprint
 , 91st place in Sprint
 , 34th place in Sprint
 , 69th place in Sprint
 , 79th place in Sprint
 , 81st place in Sprint
 , 84th place in Sprint

References

External links
Official IBU site

- World Cup 4, 2011-12 Biathlon World Cup
Biathlon World Cup - World Cup 4, 2011-12
January 2012 sports events in Europe
Biathlon competitions in Germany
Sport in Oberhof, Germany
Sport in Thuringia
2010s in Thuringia